La Mascara may refer to:
 La Mascara (wrestler), Mexican professional wrestler
 La Mascara (EP), an EP by The Blackeyed Susans